Marva Denise Hicks (May 5, 1956 – September 16, 2022) was an American R&B singer and actress. She signed with Polydor in the late 1980s, recorded her self-titled album in 1991, and later worked in Broadway theatre and on television.

Life and career

Hicks was born and grew up in Petersburg, Virginia, and studied at Howard University. 

Initially a gospel singer, she recorded commercial secular music in the 1980s, and scored her biggest chart hit with the single "Never Been in Love Before", written and produced by Jimmy Scott. The record peaked at number seven on the R&B charts in 1991, while two singles followed.   On July 16, 1996, she performed as a background singer for Michael Jackson in a free concert at the Jerudong Park Amphitheatre in Bandar Seri Begawan. The concert was in celebration of the fiftieth birthday of Hassanal Bolkiah, the Sultan of Brunei and was attended by the Brunei Royal Family. As part of the set list, Hicks sang the female part of the duet "I Just Can't Stop Loving You" with Jackson. She also performed as a background singer during Michael Jackson's HIStory World Tour.

She also performed as Rafiki in The Lion King, as an understudy for the leading actress.  Her other Broadway credits included Motown: The Musical, and Lena Horne, The Lady and Her Music.  She won the Helen Hayes Award for her stage work on three occasions. 

On television, she played T'Pel, the wife of Tuvok, in two episodes of Star Trek: Voyager, and appeared in several other recurring roles in other series.   She sang the gospel song "There's No Hiding Place Down Here" in the Babylon 5 episode "And the Rock Cried Out, No Hiding Place".

In 2013, Hicks appeared on the Yeah Yeah Yeahs' album Mosquito, performing as part of Broadway Inspirational Voices on the first single "Sacrilege".

She died in New York City on September 16, 2022, at the age of 66.

Filmography

Film

Television

References

External links

 

1956 births
2022 deaths
African-American women singer-songwriters
African-American actresses
American film actresses
21st-century African-American women singers
20th-century African-American women singers
People from Petersburg, Virginia
Singers from Virginia
Actresses from Virginia
20th-century American actresses
21st-century American actresses